Margot Bernice Forde (née Ashwin; 1 June 1935 – 23 June 1992) was a New Zealand botanist, curator, and taxonomist.

Biography
Forde was educated at Wellington Girls' College, and graduated from Victoria University College where she studied natural history and botany. She was married to fellow New Zealand botanist Bernard Forde, and they both received their PhD degrees from the Botany Department of the University of California, Davis in the early 1960s.

Margot Forde researched the plant taxonomies of Inner Mongolia, Xinjiang (China), and the Caucasus. She was a leading scientist in the field of seed conservation in grazing plants. She and her husband both did scientific work regarding climate change, with Margot building a scientific record with hundreds of samples of grasses from across New Zealand that provided evidence of climate change impacts, while Bernard worked to create New Zealand's climate laboratory in the early 1990s, attending an early international summit on the climate change in 1992the same year that Margot died from cancer.

Publications 
 
 
 , ilus.

Honours and awards 
Forde was awarded the Allan Greenstone Award for meritorious service to botany and the Sesquicentennial Gold Medal for services to science in 1990. The Margot Forde Germplasm Centre at AgResearch, in Palmerston North, was named in her honour.

Sources

References

External links 

 Bibliography at WorldCat
 Portrait

1935 births
1992 deaths
New Zealand naturalists
20th-century New Zealand botanists
Women taxonomists
New Zealand women curators
Explorers of New Zealand
20th-century New Zealand women scientists
Victoria University of Wellington alumni
University of California, Davis alumni
New Zealand taxonomists
20th-century naturalists
New Zealand women botanists
Fulbright alumni